Gerrit van Look (born 13 August 1985) is a retired German international rugby union player, having last played for the Berliner RC in the Rugby-Bundesliga and the German national rugby union team. He was also, together with Colin Grzanna, for a time the coach of the Berliner RC.

Van Look plays rugby since 1989.

His last game for Germany was against Spain on 15 November 2008 and he has since announced his international retirement. At the end of the 2009-10 season, he and his brother Hendrik retired from club rugby as well.

With eight tries, he was his club's best try scorer in the 2008-09 season.

Honours

National team
 European Nations Cup - Division 2
 Champions: 2008

Stats
Gerrit van Look's personal statistics in club and international rugby:

Club

 As of 17 May 2010

National team

European Nations Cup

Friendlies & other competitions

 As of 15 December 2010

References

External links
 Gerrit van Look at scrum.com
   Gerrit van Look at totalrugby.de

1985 births
Living people
German rugby union coaches
German rugby union players
Germany international rugby union players
Berliner RC players
Berliner SV 92 rugby players
Rugby union flankers